Ereis is a genus of longhorn beetles of the subfamily Lamiinae, containing the following species:

 Ereis annulicornis (Pascoe, 1862)
 Ereis anthriboides (Pascoe, 1857)
 Ereis distincta Pic, 1935
 Ereis javanica Breuning, 1936
 Ereis roseomaculata Breuning, 1968
 Ereis subfasciata Pic, 1925
 Ereis sumatrensis Gahan, 1907

References

Mesosini